The Five Swell Guys are a fictional 'science heroes' team from the New York City in Alan Moore's America's Best Comics series Promethea. The team meet Sophie Bangs in the first issue as she is being tracked by the Smee and later Promethea in the third issue.

The team bear a resemblance to the Fantastic Four in their use of the '5' logo on their clothing and their floating platform, similar to the Fantastic Four's Fantasticar.

Members

Bob
Leader of the team, Bob fell victim to the September 11 attacks at the World Trade Center, and for this reason does not appear at the end of the Promethea series.

Roger
Roger possesses super strength and is hence the team's muscle. Although Roger appears female, he is transgender due to an incident during an adventure in 'Suffragette City'. This causes complications for Roger, especially when Bob admits an attraction towards his new, female-presenting form. Roger's original form is seen within the comics in a portrait of the Five Swell Guys in their headquarters in space. The general public seems unaware of the transformation, referring to the female-presenting Roger as "the new Roger."

Kenneth
A psychic who first notices Sophie/Promethea. His abilities are criticised, especially when team mate Marv is injured. In all cases however, his psychic abilities prove to be correct.

Marv
Described as the genius of the team, Marv is constantly specifically targeted by the Painted Doll.

Stan
Holding mechanical aptitude Stan built the Five Swell Guys' orbital base 'The High Five' (which is in its turn a homage to the Justice League of America's satellite) as well as all of the teams' technical gadgets and tools. Although Marv claims the title of "team genius", this is the source of the hidden jealousy and animosity between Stan and Marv. This jealousy leads Stan to create the Painted Doll, hoping it would kill Marv.

Painted Doll
The Painted Doll is a sentient android, originally programmed by Stan to kill Marv and act as the Five Swell Guys' arch villain. Despite an apparent death or defeat it would always re-appear and attack again, although it is revealed later that there were many identical Painted Dolls hidden within a lake (who all kill each other, leaving only one alive). After it learns the truth of its creation the remaining Painted Doll kills Stan and joins the Five Swell Guys.

Characters created by Alan Moore
America's Best Comics superheroes